The Orange Peels is an American rock band that has its roots in the international indie-pop and indie-rock movements of the 1990s. Throughout seven albums, the group has extended its pop sensibilities beyond the borders of those genres to explore psychedelia, orchestral pop, progressive rock, and electronic music. The band’s sound has drawn comparisons to artists as varied as Todd Rundgren, Prefab Sprout, The Posies, Big Star, Yes, and R.E.M.

Though the band's lineup has changed several times, founding members Allen Clapp and Jill Pries have been the nucleus. Since the summer of 2019, the band has been a trio, made up of Clapp, Pries, and Gabriel Coan. The band completed production of a double album in late 2020 at its headquarters in the Santa Cruz Mountains. Slated for release in spring of 2021, three singles have been issued from the album: "Thank You" (2020), "Birds Are Louder" (2020), and "Give My Regards to Rufus (2021).

History

Background, formation and Square (1994–1997) 
In its early days, the group was an outgrowth of singer-songwriter Allen Clapp's fictional band Allen Clapp and his Orchestra, credited for Clapp's debut album One Hundred Percent Chance of Rain (The Bus Stop Label, 1994). Soon after the album's release, Clapp's high school friend Larry Winther reappeared after touring with garage-rock phenomenon The Mummies for four years. Clapp (guitar, vocals), Pries (bass), and Winther (drums) formed an energetic 3-piece in Redwood City, taking the fictional name from Clapp's first album. The orchestra played throughout the Bay Area and worked up new material for a second album, which they began recording at home on a four-track cassette recorder.

Soon after, music critic Jud Cost introduced Clapp to local producer Jeff Saltzman, who took on the task of engineering and producing the record in a double-wide mobile home in Campbell, California called Mysterious Cove Studios. Around this time, Maz Kattuah—Winther's bandmate from the Mummies—joined the orchestra on lead guitar. However, with the band's first recording session nearing, it was decided that Winther would be better on guitar, and Kattuah on the drums. The switch was made, but Kattuah soon left the group due to an increasing tour schedule with The Phantom Surfers.

A session drummer, Bob Vickers, was hired for the initial recording sessions (Saltzman and Vickers had recorded under the name Cerebral Corps. in the early 1990s). The Santa Cruz drummer immediately clicked with the band, and he was soon asked to join as a member in 1995. As sessions progressed, the band received offers from several labels to release the recordings. The group signed with Chicago-based Minty Fresh Records in late 1996, but the label wanted the band to finish the album with a different producer.

Clapp and his cohort flew to Minneapolis in winter to finish the album with producer-engineer Bryan Hanna, recording several of the songs live in the studio. The renewed energy of the experience transformed the group into a band distinct from Allen Clapp and his Orchestra. They officially became The Orange Peels in the early months of 1997, and their debut album, Square, was released in the late summer of that year. The album received much critical acclaim, and was nominated for two California Music Awards; best debut album and best independent album.

So Far (1998–2001)
After touring on its debut record was finished, Clapp built a modest home studio where the group embarked on the recording of its second album. Halfway through the sessions, Vickers left the group. San Francisco multi-instrumentalist John Moremen was asked to join, and the group continued playing live and recording until Winther left.

Sessions continued with the three remaining members until the rest of the album was completed. During this time, the band's headquarters moved from Redwood City to Sunnyvale, where Clapp and Pries had purchased an Eichler home. Just before the master tapes were due in Japan for release on Quattro Label, Winther and Vickers both returned with Winther on lead guitar and Vickers on either lead guitar or electric piano.

It was this lineup that toured on the release of So Far (spinART Records) in the early months of 2001. A blitz of media coverage ensued, with television appearances, radio interviews and shows. It culminated with the band being featured on the cover of the San Francisco Guardian.

Two songs, "So Far" and "The Pattern on the Wall" would go on to appear in the "Happy Birthday" episode of television show Felicity and the lead track, "Back in San Francisco" remains the band's most-downloaded song. Vickers again left soon after, reducing the band to its line up in version 4 of the group. This version of the group did considerable touring and led to a more straight-ahead rock presentation, which would be reflected on the songs being written for their third album. Just as home sessions were progressing, the group disintegrated with Winther and Moremen leaving after a tour of the East Coast.

Circling the Sun and 2020 (2002–2009)
Having already written most of the third album, Clapp and Pries decided to record the album with Bryan Hanna in Minneapolis. Joining them were multi-instrumentalist Oed Ronne and drummer Peter Anderson, both from The Ocean Blue. Hanna also drummed on the sessions. Ronne and Anderson had played with Clapp and Pries in late fall in New York on a tour for Clapp's second solo album, Available Light. They met at the Terrarium over Christmas and New Years 2002–2003 to record most of Circling the Sun.

Overdubs and a few new songs were completed later that year at the Sunnyvale studio with Ronne and with Vickers returning as a guest musician. In 2005, Parasol Records released Circling the Sun and the band embarked on West Coast and Midwest tours. The band performed west coast shows with the B-52s, The Ocean Blue, Ivy, the Apples in stereo, and ABC during this period.

This version of the group wrapped production on its fourth album, 2020 in its Sunnyvale, California studio with guest appearances by Winther, Vickers, as well as John Moremen. In particular, the album's closing song, "Broken Wing," features as many as four lead guitar players, and the lead-off track "We're Gonna Make It," Features guitar melodies by Ronne and Winther. The album was released on Nov. 10, 2009 on Minty Fresh, before the lineup changed again.

Sun Moon (2009–2013)
After 2020 was released, the lineup changed yet again, with Ronne bowing out. Rather than audition for a new lead guitarist, the Peels' long-time drummer, John Moremen, moved to lead guitar and the band began its search for a new drummer. Gabriel Coan was chosen after one audition, and the band went out over the next several months to tour the Northwest and Midwest on the material from 2020.

Amid the rehearsals, they also began recording new material, which eventually became the band's fifth album, Sun Moon (2013, Minty Fresh). The band funded the vinyl pressing through a successful 2012 Kickstarter campaign. Having written and recorded the material together at the Sunnyvale Eichler in a much more collaborative atmosphere, the live set took on the sound and feel of the sessions. The band toured the East coast, the West coast and the Midwest.

Begin the Begone (2014–2015)
On the night of their last show on the Sun Moon tour, Jill and Allen were in a serious highway accident. Stopped in traffic, the two were hit by a drunk driver. Surviving the crash with no serious injuries, the two decided to fulfill a decade-long dream by relocating from Silicon Valley to the Santa Cruz Mountains. One last session was recorded at the Eichler, which spawned almost the entire song count for a new album.

After moving to a hexagonal house in Boulder Creek, California, in spring of 2014, the group reunited in the mountains to finish overdubs and mix the album. Begin the Begone continues in the compositional style of Sun Moon, where collaboration was key, but diverges in atmospherics, which play an important role in the sound of the album.

Trespassing (2015–2018)
As "Begin the Begone" began to attract attention, the group was added to Matthew Sweet's 2015 summer tour of the midwest. Sweet subsequently asked Moremen to play on the sessions for his new album, Tomorrow Forever (2017). Meanwhile, Coan relocated to Philadelphia to work at WHYY. Clapp took the opportunity to record a solo EP, "Six Seasons" (2016). In winter 2016–17, the band began to gather demos and ideas for a new album. In March, 2017, they gathered at the new Boulder Creek headquarters with long-time collaborator Bryan Hanna at the production helm. The sessions were a departure for the band: Two tracks were recorded outdoors in the redwoods ("Dawn Tree" and "Running Away"), while others featured new textures from vintage synthesizers (a Hammond Aurora, a Yamaha CS-50, and a Crumar Orchestrator feature prominently in "Heart Gets Broken by the Song" and "Stealing Days").

Celebrate the Moments of Your Life (2018–2021)
After the band parted ways with Moremen, the remaining members continued as a three-piece. They began work on a new album in the summer of 2019, but the COVID-19 pandemic interfered, and the trio found themselves isolated in the studio, and by the time the session wrapped, the band had composed an entire new album of material. All of the material was released on a double album with Bryan Hanna mixing, and Dave Gardner (Infrasonic Sound) mastering. Three singles have since been released. The album was expected in Spring 2021 on Minty Fresh. Fans also funded a re-issue of the band's debut album, "Square" in 2019, which was pressed to vinyl for the first time, and included 2 CDs of outtakes, alternate mixes, and demos.

Band members

Current members
 Allen Clapp – vocals, guitar, piano, synthesizers (1994–present)
 Jill Pries – bass guitar (1994–present)
 Gabriel Coan – drums, synthesizers (2010–present)

Former members
 Larry Winther – drums (1995), lead guitar (1995–2002)
 Maz Kattuah – drums (1995)
 Bob Vickers – drums, keyboards, guitar (1995–2009)
 Oed Ronne – lead guitar (2002–2009)
John Moremen – drums (1999-2002), lead guitar (2009-2019)

Discography

Singles
 "A Girl for All Seasons" with "The Pattern on the Wall" (1999) The Bus Stop Label
 "Real You" (2010) Minty Fresh Records
 "Aether Tide" (2011) Minty Fresh Records
 "The Words Don't Work" (2013) Minty Fresh Records
 "Grey Holiday," with "The Old Laughing Lady (2013) Minty Fresh Records
 "9" (2014) Minty Fresh Records
"Running Away" (2018) Minty Fresh Records
"Stealing Days" (2018) Minty Fresh Records
"Thank You" (2020) Minty Fresh Records
"Birds Are Louder" (2020) Minty Fresh Records
"Give My Regards to Rufus" (2021) Minty Fresh Records

References

External links
 The Orange Peels website

Musical groups established in 1995
Indie pop groups from California
People from Sunnyvale, California
SpinART Records artists
Parasol Records artists